Sikkim Gorkha Party is a political party in the Indian state of Sikkim. The president of SGP is G.M. Rai. SGP believed that the entire Gorkha (Nepali) population of the state ought to be recognized as Scheduled Tribes (and thus get access to reservation quotas). In the state assembly elections of 2004, SGP launched G.M. Rai as a counter-candidate against the Chief Minister of the state. Rai got 1,565 votes.

Political parties in Sikkim
Political parties with year of establishment missing